Dmitri Alekseyevich Tarasov (born 18 March 1987) is a Russian former footballer who played as a central midfielder or defensive midfielder.

Career

Club
Tarasov began his career at FC Spartak Moscow, then joined FC Tom Tomsk. On 2 February 2009, FC Moscow signed the attacking midfielder on a free transfer. On 28 December 2009, Lokomotiv announced his signing.
During Lokomotiv period of his career, Tarasov established himself as holding midfielder. His authority as a starting XI player was confirmed during winter mid-season 2012-13 when he was named vice-captain. On 20 April 2013, Tarasov took captain's armband for the first time in away game versus FC Kuban Krasnodar (0-0). Later Tarasov won monthly polls among Loko fans in the social networks for best player of the month in April 2013 and September 2013.

On 30 June 2019, he left Lokomotiv after his contract expired.

On 18 February 2020, he signed with Rubin Kazan until the end of the 2019–20 season. On 21 February 2020 he broke his calf bone in a training session and wasn't expected to be able to play for Rubin for the duration of the contract. However, 2019–20 Russian Premier League season was extended due to the COVID-19 pandemic in Russia and Tarasov recovered and made his debut for Rubin on 5 July 2020 in a game against FC Orenburg. On 28 July 2020, he extended his Rubin contract until the end of 2020. On 17 December 2020 Rubin announced he will leave the club when his contract expires.

He started the 2021–22 season with Russian Football National League club FC Veles Moscow. On 19 October 2021, he left Veles and paused his professional career to spend more life with his family.

Celebrity
After his injury, he decides to join (Media Team) NaSporte(OnSport), OnSporte plays in Moscow Celebrity League, just Celebrity League,  and friendly matches with other (Media Teams), The rules are really strict every single player has to be a celebrity, character, or make videos on YouTube, TikTok, Instagram, and other Social Media platforms. On Sport is a new team to all of the Media Leagues and already earned a bad reputation, but he won't switch teams because of the money the teams are paying him.

International
Tarasov was a member of the Russian Under 21 national team. In October 2009, he was called up to the Russia national football team for the 2010 FIFA World Cup qualifier against Azerbaijan. He was called up again by Fabio Capello to the national team for the 2014 FIFA World Cup qualifiers against Portugal and against Azerbaijan in October 2012. He made his debut for the national team on 15 November 2013 in a friendly game against Serbia. He scored his first national team goal on 19 November 2013 in a friendly against South Korea.

Career statistics

Club

International

Statistics accurate as of match played 26 March 2016

International goals
Scores and results list Russia's goal tally first.

Honours
Lokomotiv Moscow
Russian Premier League: 2017–18
Russian Cup: 2014–15, 2016–17, 2018–19

Controversy
Tarasov caused controversy when he removed his shirt to reveal a vest displaying a picture of Vladimir Putin with the words "the most polite president", during an already politically charged match between Turkish opponents Fenerbahce in their 2-0 Europa League defeat on Tuesday 16 February 2016. It was anticipated that an official judging on the stunt would turn up in one month time. UEFA chose to fine him €5000.

Personal life
Tarasov has a daughter from his first wife, Russian gymnast Oksana Ponomarenko. Tarasov was then married to Russian TV personality Olga Buzova from June 2012 til December 2016.  In January 2018, Tarasov married Russian model Anastasia Tarasova (née Kostenko) and they have 2 daughters together.

Notes

References

External links
 
 Player page on the official FC Tom Tomsk site 
 
 Player page on the official FC Lokomotiv site 

1987 births
Footballers from Moscow
Living people
Russian footballers
Russia under-21 international footballers
Russia international footballers
FC Tom Tomsk players
FC Moscow players
Russian Premier League players
FC Lokomotiv Moscow players
Association football midfielders
2017 FIFA Confederations Cup players
FC Spartak Moscow players
FC Rubin Kazan players
FC Veles Moscow players
Russian First League players